Grégoire Gaël Nkama (born 30 August 1994) is a Cameroonian footballer who plays as a centre forward for Equatorial Guinean Liga Nacional club Futuro Kings FC.

References

External links
 profile

1994 births
Living people
People from Garoua
Cameroonian footballers
Association football forwards
JS Kabylie players
Futuro Kings FC players
Cameroonian expatriate footballers
Cameroonian expatriate sportspeople in Algeria
Expatriate footballers in Algeria
Cameroonian expatriate sportspeople in Equatorial Guinea
Expatriate footballers in Equatorial Guinea